The Clarence Whitman Mansion is a historic townhouse on the Upper East Side of Manhattan in New York City, U.S. It was designed in the Renaissance Revival architectural style by Parish & Schroeder, and its construction was completed in 1898. It belonged to Sam Salz, an art dealer, from the 1940s to the 1970s. It was purchased by Bungo Shimada, a Japanese philanthropist, in 1990.

References

Upper East Side
Houses completed in 1898
Houses in Manhattan
Renaissance Revival architecture in New York City
1898 establishments in New York City